"Boulevard of Broken Dreams" is a song by the British rock band Smokie from their 1989 album Boulevard of Broken Dreams. It was also released as a single (at the very end of 1989).

Commercial performance 
The single debuted at number 77 in the UK (on the week of 31 December 1989 — 6 January 1990).

Charts

References

External links 

 Smokie – "Boulevard of Broken Dreams" at Discogs

1989 songs
1989 singles
Smokie (band) songs
Songs written by Alan Silson
Wag Records singles
Polydor Records singles